Indukti is a progressive metal band from Poland, founded in 1999. Their debut album, S.U.S.A.R., featured Mariusz Duda of the Polish band Riverside on vocals.

Indukti's performances of concerts and festivals include NEARfest 2007 and Baja Prog Festival 2007. According to their website, Indukti entered the studio on 7 January 2008 to start recording their latest album, IDMEN, which was released on 24 July 2009.

Lineup
Wawrzyniec Dramowicz – drums, percussion
 Ewa Jabłońska – violin
 Piotr Kocimski – guitars
 Maciej Jaśkiewicz – guitars
 Andrzej Kaczyński – bass guitar, doublebass

Discography

Albums

Singles and music videos
"Shade" (2005)

References

External links
 Official website

Polish progressive metal musical groups
Folk metal musical groups
Musical groups established in 1999
1999 establishments in Poland
Mystic Production artists
Musical quintets